

The Ambrosini SAI 1 was a two-seat biplane aircraft built in Italy to compete in the 1935 Avioraduno del Littorio rally.  It was of conventional configuration, and featured a neatly cowled radial engine and a long canopy fairing for added streamlining.

Specifications

References
 

SAI Ambrosini aircraft
1930s Italian sport aircraft
Biplanes
Single-engined tractor aircraft
Aircraft first flown in 1935